Frank Halai (born 6 March 1988) is a Tongan rugby union player who plays as a winger for the Austin Gilgronis in Major League Rugby (MLR). 

He previously played for Pau in the Top 14. and for Counties Manukau in the ITM Cup, and before that Waikato. Halai is a former All Black Sevens and All Black representative, having played one test match in 2013.

Career
Halai made his Super Rugby debut in Round 1 of the 2013 season when he started on the wing and played all 80 minutes of a 34-20 win over the Hurricanes in Wellington, scoring a try in the process. He ended the season as the Super Rugby leading try scorer with 10, and was third in line breaks with 21, behind his Blues team mates Rene Ranger and Charles Piutau who had 24 each.

On 16 March 2017, Halai leaves Wasps in England for French club Pau in the Top 14 from the 2017-18 season.

Notes

External links
 

 Blues profile
 Steelers profile
 
 Wasps RFC profile 

Tongan emigrants to New Zealand
Tongan rugby union players
1988 births
Living people
New Zealand international rugby union players
Rugby union wings
Blues (Super Rugby) players
Counties Manukau rugby union players
Waikato rugby union players
New Zealand international rugby sevens players
Wasps RFC players
New Zealand expatriate rugby union players
New Zealand expatriate sportspeople in France
Expatriate rugby union players in France
People from Haʻapai
Section Paloise players
Austin Gilgronis players